The Strand Palace Hotel is a large hotel on the north side of the Strand, London, England, positioned close to Covent Garden, Aldwych, Trafalgar Square and the River Thames.

History
The hotel was built after Exeter Hall was demolished in 1907. It opened in 1909
 and was refurbished in the Art Deco style during the 1930s, but has now been modernised with the latest refurbishment in 2019.

Strand Hotel Limited was incorporated on 31 October 1907, with some 4,000 shareholders. Created by the Salmon and Gluckstein families, it was established to fund the building of the Strand Palace Hotel. J. Lyons & Co. acquired shares in this enterprise in 1922, and also bought the adjoining Haxells family hotel in order to expand and improve the Strand Hotel. At that time, a single room with breakfast would have set you back five shillings and six pence – just 27p in today’s money.

After extensive redevelopment, the hotel became an art deco showcase, and re-opened in 1928, with 980 bedrooms.  The rear of the property was occupied by the Winter Garden Restaurant, which had a large domed ceiling and could seat over 500 guests, who were served by over one hundred staff.

In February 1946, Neville Heath was found by staff members in a room standing over the body of Pauline Rees, an incident occurring during Heath's murder career.

After the war, the hotel made several improvements. Private bathrooms were installed in all guest rooms in 1958; this reduced the overall number of rooms at the hotel to 788. The new bathroom facilities meant that oil-fired boilers had to be installed.

In 1968, the front hall and ground floor restaurants, including the Winter Garden, were redesigned, and the first computerised billing system in London was installed. The revolving doors and other parts of the foyer designed by Oliver Bernard were removed in this redesign, but were of such fine quality and historic interest that the curators at the Victoria and Albert Museum requested them for their collection in 1969. The pieces were dismantled and stored in the museum's Battersea depot. The doors were exhibited in 2003 in the museum's major exhibition 'Art Deco: 1910–1939', following reconstruction.

In 1976, Forte bought the lease of the Strand Palace Hotel from the Lyons Hotel Group. Over the next ten years, there was minor refurbishment throughout the hotel. In 1985, a more in-depth refurbishment was undertaken on all floors of the new hotel; this included new furniture, new bathrooms and a redecoration of the bedrooms.

London and Regional Properties took over the hotel in 2006. They contracted Michael Gallie to deliver an updated floor plan and area referencing, and outline the external elevations.

Rooms 
The Strand Palace hotel has 788 rooms which all air-conditioned and were refurbished in 2019. There are 288 single rooms in the hotel which makes it ideal for solo travellers. The hotel also has studio rooms which are ideal for families up to four people.

Food & Beverage

Haxells Restaurant & Bar 
The hotel has a modern British restaurant called Haxells Restaurant & Bar. It serves breakfast, lunch, afternoon tea and dinner. The breakfast is well reviewed for the variety and value it offers. The afternoon tea is often themed seasonally with the festive 2022 afternoon tea in partnership with Benjamin Pollock's Toy Shop featuring on Forbes' list of top festive teas in London. The restaurant also offers a pre-theatre menu that is ideally suited to theatre-goes in the theatreland.

Gin Palace 
The hotel also houses an elegant cocktail bar which is open till late for pre or post theatre drinks.

References

External links 
 Hotel website

Hotels established in 1909
Hotel buildings completed in 1909
Hotels in London
Buildings and structures in the City of Westminster
Art Deco hotels
Art Deco architecture in London
1909 establishments in England
Strand, London